Sheridan Technical College and Technical High School is a public post-secondary technical educational institution and a magnet school in Broward County, Florida. It has three campuses:  Main Campus in Hollywood, West Campus in Pembroke Pines, and High School in Fort Lauderdale. The college offers over 40 technical programs.

Schools in Broward County, Florida